Night Bus is a 2007 Italian noir-comedy film directed by Davide Marengo. A low-budget film, it became a sleeper box office hit.

Plot
Set in Rome, Davide Marengo's crime story revolves around two main characters, a female thief, Leila (Mezzogiorno), whose modus operandi of looting her victims is by administering drugs or seducing them, and a lonely bus driver, Franz (Mastandrea), who is up to his neck in debt. The real story advances when the duo happens to come into possession of a valuable microchip valued at 4 million euros. The film's plot comes across more twists as a pair of hardened criminals, Garafano (Pannofino) and Diolaiti (Citran), and a retired intelligence officer, Carlo Matera (Fantastichini), enter the scene.

Cast 
Giovanna Mezzogiorno as Leila Ronchi
Valerio Mastandrea as Franz
Ennio Fantastichini as Carlo Matera
Francesco Pannofino as Garofano
Roberto Citran as Diolaiti
Iaia Forte as Micia
Ivan Franek as Andrea
Marcello Mazzarella as Sandro
Antonio Catania as Bergamini
Sascha Zacharias as Alessia
Mario Rivera as Titti
Paolo Calabresi as Paolo

References

External links

2007 films
Italian comedy films
2007 comedy films
Italian neo-noir films